Daniel Brown (born 12 September 1980) is a former footballer who is currently manager of Billericay Town.

Career
Brown came through the youth ranks at Watford, before spending two years at Leyton Orient where he made only one first team appearance in a Football League Trophy match at Peterborough United on 8 December 1998. He scored 16 times from 19 youth games in 1998–99.

He completed a £40,000 transfer to Barnet in 1999 where he played 97 games in all competitions, scoring eight goals. In 2003, he suffered a groin injury which required an operation in October 2002, but in December a scan revealed a muscle tear and a further delay in his comeback. In February 2003, he sustained a fracture of the metatarsal during a training session and was out of action for a further month, playing just 12 games in the 2002–03 season.

In May 2003, he rejected an offer from Bee's new boss Martin Allen of a three-month contract to prove his fitness and had his sights on finding a Football League club. He moved to Third Division Oxford United in July 2003.

In two seasons with Oxford, Brown was further dogged by injury and managed just 18 appearances. At the end of his contract he joined Conference side Crawley Town on a free transfer in August 2005. Crawley manager John Hollins made him captain for the 2006–07 season, but after 37 outings for Crawley he was released from his contract following financial difficulties at the club. Cambridge United manager Jimmy Quinn swooped to sign him in November 2006 and he became a mainstay in the United midfield.

In November 2008, Brown transferred to Conference National side Eastbourne Borough on a loan lasting until 1 January. In January, after much interest by other big clubs, Brown signed a contract at Eastbourne Borough lasting until the end of the season. In the absence of Captain Paul Armstrong, he was made the club captain. In April 2009, Brown was enjoying his time at Eastbourne stating he made the right choice and was in talks to extend his part-time contract for another year. In May 2009, it was confirmed that Brown had signed a two-year deal at Priory Lane.
Brown departed Priory Lane in January 2011 to join Harlow Town after a loan spell there.

Coaching career
Danny Brown retired from playing in 2015  and went into coaching, acting as interim manager at Billericay Town F.C. after the departure of manager Kevin Watson. Brown was again appointed as Interim Manager of Billericay Town on 19 April with the club sitting bottom of the league, one point from safety, with just four matches remaining. Brown was unable to save the club from relegation, a 2–1 defeat in the penultimate game of the season seeing the club relegated to the Isthmian League.

References

External links
Cambridge United profile

1980 births
Living people
Footballers from Bethnal Green
English footballers
Barnet F.C. players
Oxford United F.C. players
Crawley Town F.C. players
Cambridge United F.C. players
Eastbourne Borough F.C. players
Harlow Town F.C. players
English Football League players
National League (English football) players
Leyton Orient F.C. players
Association football midfielders
Billericay Town F.C. managers